Cempaka Putih Barat is an administrative village in the Cempaka Putih district of Indonesia. It has a postal code of 10520.

See also
 List of administrative villages of Jakarta

Administrative villages in Jakarta
Cempaka Putih